Sitting on the Golden Porch is a 1986 Soviet fantasy film directed by Boris Rytsarev.

Plot 
The film tells of two kings: Fedot and Amfibrakhy, who have been side by side for a long time. Suddenly Amfibrakhy disappeared, leaving the queen and daughter. It was too difficult for the Queen to rule the state alone and she decides to marry her daughter. Fedot had three sons, one of whom was able to conquer the heart of Alena and liberate Amfibrakhy.

Cast 
 Yelena Denisova as Princess
 Gennady Frolov as Ivan-tsarevich
 Sergey Nikolaev as Pavel-tsarevich
 Aleksandr Novikov as Pyotr-tsarevich
 Mikhail Pugovkin as Tsar Fedot
 Tatyana Konyukhova as tsaritsa
 Leonid Kuravlyov as king Amfibrakhy
 Lidiya Fedoseeva-Shukshina as Queen
 Viktor Sergachyov as Koschei
 Zinovy Gerdt as Vodyanoy

References

External links 
 

1986 films
1980s Russian-language films
Soviet fantasy films
Gorky Film Studio films
1986 fantasy films
Films based on children's books
Films based on fairy tales